Legionella rowbothamii is a Gram-negative, catalase-positive, oxidase-negative bacterium from the genus Legionella which was isolated from water and sludge from an industrial liquifier tower.
Discovered by Tim Rowbotham.

References

External links
Type strain of Legionella rowbothamii at BacDive -  the Bacterial Diversity Metadatabase

Legionellales
Bacteria described in 2001